Yanis Mbombo Lokwa (born 8 April 1994) is a Belgian professional footballer who plays as a forward for Liga 1 club RANS Nusantara.

Club career
Born in Brussels, Mbombo is a youth exponent of Standard Liège. He made his professional debut for the club on 12 December 2013 in a UEFA Europa League game against Swedish side IF Elfsborg as a starter. He played the full game and scored the only goal for Standard, losing 3–1.

On 4 January 2022, Mbombo signed for Belgian First Division B side Virton.

References

External links
 
 

1994 births
Living people
Footballers from Brussels
Association football forwards
Belgian footballers
Belgian people of Democratic Republic of the Congo descent
R.S.C. Anderlecht players
R.W.D.M. Brussels F.C. players
K.V. Mechelen players
Standard Liège players
AJ Auxerre players
Sint-Truidense V.V. players
FC Sochaux-Montbéliard players
Örebro SK players
Royal Excel Mouscron players
Oud-Heverlee Leuven players
FC Stade Lausanne Ouchy players
U.D. Vilafranquense players
Lyon La Duchère players
R.E. Virton players
FC Brașov (2021) players
Belgian Pro League players
Challenger Pro League players
Belgian expatriate footballers
Expatriate footballers in France
Expatriate footballers in Romania
Expatriate footballers in Switzerland
Ligue 2 players
Allsvenskan players
Liga Portugal 2 players
Liga II players
Belgium under-21 international footballers
Belgium youth international footballers